Immunoglobulin lambda-like polypeptide 1 is a protein that in humans is encoded by the IGLL1 gene. IGLL1 has also recently been designated CD179B (cluster of differentiation 179B).

It is associated with agammaglobulinemia-2.

The preB cell receptor is found on the surface of proB and preB cells, where it is involved in transduction of signals for cellular proliferation, differentiation from the proB cell to the preB cell stage, allelic exclusion at the Ig heavy chain gene locus, and promotion of Ig light chain gene rearrangements. The preB cell receptor is composed of a membrane-bound Ig mu heavy chain in association with a heterodimeric surrogate light chain. This gene encodes one of the surrogate light chain subunits and is a member of the immunoglobulin gene superfamily. This gene does not undergo rearrangement. Mutations in this gene can result in B cell deficiency and agammaglobulinemia, an autosomal recessive disease in which few or no gamma globulins or antibodies are made. Two transcript variants encoding different isoforms have been found for this gene.

References

Further reading

Clusters of differentiation